Sirhind-Fategarh is a town and a municipal council in the Fatehgarh Sahib district in the Indian state of Punjab.

Demographics

In the 2011 census Sirhind-Fatehgarh had a population of 60852. Males constituted 54% of the population and females 46%. Sirhind-Fatehgarh had an average literacy rate of 90%, higher than the national average of 74%: male literacy is 84%, and female literacy was 80%. 12% of the population was under 6 years of age.

Etymology
According to popular notion, Sirhind, comes from 'Sar-i hind', meaning the Frontier of Hind, as the Mughal emperors saw it as the 'gateway to Hindustan'.

History

In his Sanskrit treatise, Brihat Samhita, Varahamihira (505 – 587) mentions the city as 'Satudar Desh'. Later it was inhabited by a tribe of 'Sairindhas Aryans, leading to its present name. According to Huan Tsang, the Chinese traveller who visited India during the seventh century, Sirhind was the capital of the district of Shitotulo, or Shatadru (the present day River Sutlej).

In the 12th century, Sirhind came under the rule of the Hindu Chauhan Rajputs of Delhi. During the rule of Prithvi Raj Chauhan (1168–1192), the Hindu Rajput ruler of Delhi, it became his military outpost.

It became a provincial capital during the Mughal Empire, controlling the Lahore-Delhi Highway. During the Mughal era, Sirhind was the name for Malwa, the area's capital city. Sirhind was the headquarters of the Mughal administration in Eastern Punjab. Many European travelers describe its splendours, and it developed into a cultural center.

Sirhind was known for dozens of saints, scholars, poets, historians, calligraphers and scribes who lived there. This city is famous to Muslims for Great saint Imām-e-Rabbānī Shaykh Ahmad al-Farūqī al-Sirhindī (R.) (1564–1624). He was an Indian Islamic scholar of Arab origin, a Hanafi jurist, and a prominent member of the Naqshbandī Sufi order. Many buildings survive from this period, including Aam Khas Bagh; it is said that in its heyday, the city had 360 mosques, gardens, tombs, caravansarais and wells.

Education

University
 Sri Guru Granth Sahib World University

Engineering College
 Baba Banda Singh Bahadur Engineering College

General degree colleges
 Mata Gujri College, Fatehgarh Sahib.        
 Saffron College for Girls, Kotla Bajwara

Law College
 Lincoln College of Law, Sirhind

Polytechnic College
 Baba Banda Singh Bahadur Polytechnic College

Teacher Training College
Lincoln College of Education, Sirhind

CISCE affiliated school
Baalak Yesu Convent School

Punjab School Education Board affiliated schools
 Ashoka Sen. Sec. School, Sirhind
 Baba Dyalpuri Sen.sec.school, Sirhind
 BZSFS.SEN.SEC PUBLIC SCHOOL, Fatehgarh Sahib
 Dyanand High School, Sirhind
 Government girls senior secondary school, Sirhind Mandi
 Mata Sundri Public School, Fatehgarh Sahib
 M G Ashoka Girls College, Sirhind
 Rana Munshi Ram Sarvhitkari school, Sirhind
 Sirhind Public School, Sirhind

Central Board Of Secondary education (CBSE) affiliated schools
 St.Mary's School, Mahadian, Fatehgarh Sahib
 Divine Light International school
 Jesus Saviour's School
 Saffron City School
 Garden Valley International School
 Greenfield Public School

Other
 Lakshya Computer Education, Sirhind Mandi

Historical and religious places in Sirhind-Fatehgarh Sahib
 Gurudwara Fatehgarh Sahib
 Gurdwara Jyoti Sarup
 Dashnami Akhara
 Gurdwara Shahid Ganj
 Gurdwara Patshahi Chevin
Rauza Sharif (Shrine of Syed Ahmad Sirhindi)
 Tomb of Ustad and Shagird
 Tomb of Mir-I-Miran, Sirhind
 Aam Khas Bagh, Sirhind
 Mata Shri Chakreshwari Devi Jain Temple Village Attewali (Sirhind)
 Gurdwara moti ram mehra ji
 Jahaji Haveli, Haveli of Diwan Todar Mal
 Dera Baba Biram Dass Ji ( VPO Badhouchhi Kalan)

Gallery

See also
Reona Bhola
Bhatt Majra
Kotla Suleman

Further reading
 Subhash Parihar, History and Architectural Remains of Sirhind, 2006, Aryan Books International. .
Subhash Parihar, "Medieval Sirhind and its Monuments", Marg (Mumbai), vol. 55, no. 4, June 2004, pp. 42–57.
Subhash Parihar, "Historic Mosques of Sirhind". Islamic Studies, 43(3)(2004): 481–510.
Subhash Parihar, "Arabic and Persian Inscriptions from Sirhind". Islamic Studies, 38(2)(1999): 255–74.

References

External links
 Battle_of_Sirhind Battle of Sirhind at Sikhstudies.org
www.sirhindinfo.com

Cities and towns in Fatehgarh Sahib district
Former capital cities in India